Gheorghe Fieraru (born 24 August 1936) is a Romanian volleyball player. He competed in the men's tournament at the 1964 Summer Olympics.

Personal life
Fieraru is the grandfather of basketball players Maria and Ana Ferariu.

References

External links
 

1936 births
Living people
Romanian men's volleyball players
Olympic volleyball players of Romania
Volleyball players at the 1964 Summer Olympics
Sportspeople from Brașov